"Suspicion" is a 1962 song originally recorded by Elvis Presley written by Doc Pomus and  Mort Shuman which became a major hit in 1964 in a recording by Elvis Presley sound-alike Terry Stafford.

Elvis Presley version
One of 25 songs written by Pomus and Shuman for Elvis Presley, "Suspicion" was recorded by Presley on March 19, 1962, in Studio B of RCA's Nashville studio and issued on Presley's album Pot Luck released on June 15, 1962. In April 1964, when the Terry Stafford version of "Suspicion" (recorded in May 1962 as a demo) was in the Top Ten of the Billboard Hot 100, the Presley original was given a US single release with "Kiss Me Quick" as the flip, and it was "Kiss Me Quick" which was the favored side, reaching  nationally.

The song was published by Elvis Presley Music, Inc.

In Australia "Kiss Me Quick" and "Suspicion" appeared on the chart as a double A-side hit with a  peak: the actual format for this Australian release was a four-track EP entitled Elvis Sings Kiss Me Quick which featured "Kiss Me Quick" and "Suspicion" as A-side tracks with a B-side composed of "Sentimental Me" and "I Want You With Me".

"Suspicion" was also issued as a single in several European territories to vie with the Terry Stafford version with the Presley version charting in the Netherlands and the Dutch chart for Belgium with respective peaks of #9 and #6 and also in Norway where its chart peak was #9 and in Denmark where it peaked at #3: in its European single release "Suspicion" featured "It Hurts Me" as B-side.

Terry Stafford version
After an unsuccessful affiliation with A&M Records, Terry Stafford cut a demo of "Suspicion" at the Los Angeles studio of Bob Summers. Summers, best known as the producer of the 1959 Larry Hall hit "Sandy", played all the instruments on the demo which Stafford and Stafford's manager pitched to record companies in the Los Angeles area and also to local radio stations including KFWB where disc jockey Gene Weed was impressed enough with the demo to take it next door to the headquarters of the newly formed Crusader Records. John Fisher, the president of Crusader, spent several hours remastering the demo with the resultant track becoming the second single released on Crusader. The arrangement included rhythmic backing accompaniment with an Ondioline, an idiosyncratic French-built electronic keyboard.

After breaking out in San Bernardino in January 1964 "Suspicion" had its top-tier market breakout in Los Angeles in February 1964 peaking in March 1964 at respectively number 2 and number 4 on the hit parades of KRLA and KFWB and then quickly spread east, hitting number 1 on WLS (Chicago) for most of April.  Nationally "Suspicion" rose from number 7 to number 6 on the Billboard Hot 100 dated 4 April 1964, when the chart's top five hits were all by the Beatles. "Suspicion" broke the Beatles' monopoly on the top five spots on the chart by rising to #3, its peak position, the next week. Stafford's "Suspicion" reached #31 in the UK Singles Chart, and also #3 in Canada.

Cover versions
"Suspicion" first became a C&W chart hit in 1971 via a remake by Bobby G. Rice which reached #33 C&W, with the track being included on Rice's debut album Hit After Hit.

In 1988 "Suspicion" charted for Ronnie McDowell whose version, taken from McDowell's I'm Still Missing You album, reached #27 C&W.

In 1964, Hong Kong songstress Rebecca Pan covered '"Suspicion" on her LP album I Love You, released by Diamond Records.

In 2005, Bahamian singer composer Diana Hamilton covered '"Suspicion" on her LP album A Bahamian in Paris, in collaboration with Eric Henri-Gréard, songwriter Florian Lacour, and produced by Patrick Rouchon.

A maniacal version of the song was recorded by Vivian Stanshall, produced by Keith Moon.

"Suspicion" has also been covered by Jimmy London, Millicent Martin, Larry Marshall and Delroy Wilson.

Phil Spector composition claim
In a 2002 interview with journalist Mick Brown, record producer Phil Spector claimed he wrote and/or produced "Suspicion", but did not receive credit: "I made 'Suspicion' for Terry Stafford -- I didn't get any credit or any money. I didn't care. I just loved making records."

See also
 List of 1960s one-hit wonders in the United States

References

1964 singles
Songs with music by Mort Shuman
Songs with lyrics by Doc Pomus
Elvis Presley songs
Terry Stafford songs
Ronnie McDowell songs
1962 songs
RCA Victor singles
Bobby G. Rice songs
Phil Spector